Donald L. Barlett (born July 17, 1936) is an American investigative journalist and author who often collaborates with James B. Steele. According to The Washington Journalism Review, they were a better investigative reporting team than even Bob Woodward and Carl Bernstein. Together they have won two Pulitzer Prizes, two National Magazine Awards and six George Polk Awards. In addition, they have been recognized by their peers with awards from Investigative Reporters and Editors on five separate occasions. They are known for their reporting technique of  delving deep into documents and then, after what could be a long investigative period, interviewing the necessary sources. The duo has been working together for over 40 years and is frequently referred to as Barlett and Steele.

Early life and education 
Barlett was raised in Johnstown, Pennsylvania. He attended Penn State University.

Career
After Penn State, Barlett served three years as a special agent with the U.S. Army Counter Intelligence Corps until 1956, when he began his journalistic career as a reporter for the Reading (Pennsylvania) Times. Nine years later he became an investigative journalist for The Plain Dealer, and later took similar jobs with The Chicago Daily News and The Philadelphia Inquirer, where he was to join his collaborator James B. Steele. In 1997, Barlett and Steele became editors-at-large for Time. In 2006, they moved to Vanity Fair as contributing editors. Over the years, Barlett and Steele wrote on such diverse topics as crime, housing, nuclear waste, tax loopholes, the decline of the middle class's standard of living, Howard Hughes, the role of big money in politics, oil prices, immigration, and health care. 
 
Barlett and Steele won two Pulitzers and were recognized for their contributions to American journalism for their work while at The Philadelphia Inquirer. In 1972, during one of their earliest collaborations for The Inquirer, Barlett and Steele pioneered the use of computers for the analysis of data on violent crimes.  Barlett and Steele won their first Pulitzer Prize for National Reporting and the Gerald Loeb Special Award in 1975 for a series called "Auditing the Internal Revenue Service" published by The Inquirer. They won their second Pulitzer Prize for National Reporting and the Gerald Loeb Award for Large Newspapers in 1989 at the Inquirer for their coverage of temporary tax breaks embedded in the Tax Reform Act of 1986. Their 1991 Inquirer series America: What Went Wrong? was named by the New York University department of journalism as 51st on its list of the 100 best pieces of journalism of the 20th century.  Rewritten as a book it became a No. 1 New York Times bestseller.  It is one of seven books Barlett and Steele have published, five of which were written while at The Inquirer.

After 26 years as a team for The Inquirer, Barlett and Steele left to pursue investigative reporting at Time. It was while they were at Time that the investigative reporting team won their two National Magazine Awards, as well at their record breaking 6th George Polk Award, although this time for excellence in magazine journalism.

After leaving Time over monetary issues, Barlett and Steele were hired by Vanity Fair to be contributing editors on the understanding that they would contribute two articles in their signature long-form style each year. In 2007, Barlett and Steele, while still working for Vanity Fair, were featured in the PBS documentary series, Exposé: America's Investigative Reports, in an episode entitled "Friends In High Places," which was about government contracts. When asked on the program how they have managed to work for so many years together, Barlett said, "We're both very boring. Who else reads the tax codes?" Their lifelong passion for documents have fueled their career and led to important and award-winning journalism.

Barlett is married and has a son as well as a stepson.

Impact 
Barlett and Steele are used as examples in investigative reporting textbooks as a model of technique and excellence in journalism. As career investigative journalists, Barlett and Steele have become well known for their teamwork, "documents state of mind," consistent accuracy, "replicability" for revealing their sources, and ability to make their work relevant to ordinary people, such as in "America: What Went Wrong?". Their employers, especially Gene Roberts at The Inquirer, provided them with the opportunity to spend a long period of time reviewing documents in pursuit of journalism with depth and gave them the space to publish their work in lengthy articles in newspapers and magazines.

About Barlett and Steele, fellow investigative reporter Bob Woodward said, "They're an institution. They have kind of perfected a method of doing their work, and I have the highest regard for it. Systematic, comprehensive - they take a long time, and they don't mind saying what their conclusions are."

Both Pulitzer Prize Awards illustrate the auditing function of investigative journalism, whereby the press as "The Fourth Estate" watches over government. In 1975, they audited the Internal Revenue Service. In 1989, they acted as watchdogs over the House Ways and Means Committee Chair Dan Rostenkowski and the insertion by Democrats and Republicans of temporary tax breaks in the Tax Reform Act of 1986.

Barlett and Steele are acknowledged as having affected business investigative journalism throughout their four-decade career, and the Donald W. Reynolds National Center for Business Journalism established an annual award in their name in 2007.

Published works

Books

Newspaper articles

"America: What Went Wrong?"

"America: Who Stole the Dream?"

Magazine articles

References 
References

Notes

External links 

 Don Barlett and Jim Steele's website
 Barlett & Steele Awards for Investigative Business Journalism
 Terry Gross's interview about gambling on reservations with Barlett & Steele on NPR's Fresh Air (16 December 2002)
 Terry Gross's interview "The Big Business of Health Care" with Barlett & Steele on NPR's Fresh Air (6 October 2004)
 Exposé:"Friends in High Places" on PBS (July 2007)
 Liberadio(!) Interview with Don Barlett (12 February 2007)
 
In Depth interview with Barlett and Steele, January 6, 2013

1936 births
Living people
American political writers
American male non-fiction writers
American investigative journalists
The Philadelphia Inquirer people
Time (magazine) people
Vanity Fair (magazine) people
Pulitzer Prize for National Reporting winners
Gerald Loeb Award winners for Large Newspapers
Gerald Loeb Special Award winners